Hässelbyholm is a Renaissance style manor house in Strängnäs Municipality, Södermanland County, Sweden.

History
Hässelbyholm is located on a peninsula in Lake Mälaren.
Hässelbyholm was the result of the merger of the two estates Hässelby and Ekeby in Södermanland. Werner Brunkow Ekeby sold the property in 1279 to  the Bishop of Strängnäs. Into the mid-14th century, Hässelbyholm belonged to Vårfruberga Abbey. With the Protestant Reformation, the property became crown property. In 1738,  Hässelbyholm sold to Christina Piper, (1673–1752) widow of Count Carl Piper (1647–1716).  In 1747, she  made Hässelbyholm a Fideicommissum for his granddaughter Countess Eva Charlotta Bielke and her heirs.

See also
Hässelby
List of castles in Sweden

References

Other Sources
This article is fully or partially based on material from Nordisk familjebok, Hässelbyholm, 1904–1926.

External links
Castles around Lake Mälaren

Buildings and structures in Södermanland County